Cadlinella hirsuta is a species of sea slug or dorid nudibranch, a marine gastropod mollusk in the family Chromodorididae.

Distribution
This species was described from New Caledonia.

References

Chromodorididae
Gastropods described in 1995